Eastbourne Town Women F.C. is an English football club based in Eastbourne, East Sussex, England. They currently play in the Sussex County Women and Girls Football League Division One, the 8th tier of English women's football.

They are founding members of the Sussex County Women and Girls Football League in 2004.

Eastbourne Town Women play their home games at The Saffrons, and are affiliated to Eastbourne Town.

History

2002–2011: The early years
Originally known as Eastbourne Town Ladies, they were formed in the summer of 2002. They applied and entered into the South East Counties Women's League Division Three in the 2002–03 season, finishing third place below Woking Reserves and Lindfield, the were promoted into Division Two along with Crawley Wasps. They finished 8th and they transferred into the newly formed Sussex County Women and Girls Football League for the 2004–05 season and won the Sussex County Women's Challenge Trophy. They transferred back into the South East Counties League, Division One in 2005. They won the 2008–09 Division One title and were promoted into the Premier Division, also winning the South East Counties Chairman's Cup, effectively winning a double. The 2010–11 nearly saw them complete an another double. Although losing the SEC League Cup final, they became the League winners and earnt promotion into the London and South East Women's Regional Football League Premier Division for the first time, at the time there was only one division in the league. They reached 2nd place in their first season, but form slipped over the next few seasons, hovering just outside the relegation zone.

2011–2021: London & South East league
After 12 years, Gary Pearce, the manager had stepped down and 2014–15 season saw player Emma Parslow and Theo Parfitt take over as joint managers. Although finishing 11th the league, the women made their record Women's FA Cup run during the 2014–15 season by reaching the Third round, starting their run winning 7–0 to Burgess Hill Town Women, 3–1 to Parkwood Rangers and 5–0 to Gosport Borough Ladies in the first, second and third qualifying rounds, the First round proper saw a 1–1 draw after extra time with Chichester City Ladies but winning the penalty shootout 5–4 taking them to the Second round with Queens Park Rangers Girls winning 1–0 before losing in the Third round to Derby County Women 2–4 after extra time. All of Eastbourne Town's games were played at home.

For the next six seasons, the Ladies continued to hover around the relegation zone, with several management changes and a poor form of results. On 10 June 2019 the team renamed themselves to Eastbourne Town Women and a few months later came the COVID-19 pandemic which halted the 2019–20 season along with the following season. After which the then manager, Zak Dove, stepped down and 18 players had left the club to join over clubs. The Football Club board decided it would be best to take voluntary relegation into the Sussex County Women and Girls Football League

2021–present

After 16 years since leaving, the Women re-joined the Sussex County Women and Girls Football League Premier Division with a new manager, Martin Keightley, and a new team. With some women staying from the previous season and some who were in the early ladies team re-joined the team but the first season in the Premier Division and Theo Parfitt taking over as caretaker manager duties with Rick Tate taking the permanent role in February 2022. The Women were relegated into Division One for the 2022–23 season

Ground

Eastbourne Town Women currently play their home games at The Saffrons, Compton Place Road, Eastbourne, East Sussex, BN21 1EA. Located in Eastbourne town centre, a 5-minute walk from Eastbourne Railway Station.

Current squad

Management and staff

Current staff
As of 10 March 2023

Managerial history

Season summary

Honors

League honours
London and South East Women's Regional Football League
Premier Division Runners-up (1): 2011–12
South East Counties Women's League
 Premier Division Champions (1): 2010–11
 Division 1 West Champions (1): 2008–09
 Division 1 West Runners-up (1): 2007–08

Cup hounours
South East Counties Women's League Cup
 Runners up: 2010–11
South East Counties Women's Chairman's Cup
 Winners: 2008–09
Sussex County Challenge Trophy
 Winners: 2004–05

Club records
Best League Performance: London & South East Premier Division 2011–12, 2nd
Best Women's FA Cup performance: Third Round, 2014–15
Biggest League Win: 17 - 0 v Meadow Sports, South East Counties Women's League, 19 April 2009 
Biggest Cup Win: 10 - 1 v Sheerness East, SECW League Cup, 2 November 2008
Most points in a season: 43 in 18 games, South East Counties Division 1 West 2007–08

Notes

References

External links
 Official site

 
Women's football clubs in England
Football clubs in East Sussex
Sport in Eastbourne
Sussex County Women and Girls Football League